William Stewart Chalmers (5 March 1907 – 13 November 1989) was a Scottish amateur football inside right who played for Queens Park, Heart of Midlothian, Manchester United, Dunfermline Athletic and the Scottish national team.

Career 
Chalmers was born and grew up in the southern Glasgow suburb of Mount Florida, in the vicinity of Hampden Park. He joined local side Queen's Park and played five seasons with them while he completed his studies. He turned professional in 1929, when he joined Edinburgh side Heart of Midlothian. He moved to Manchester United in September 1932 and then returned to Scotland with Dunfermline Athletic in 1934, where he finished his playing career.

Chalmers played once for the Scotland national football team, against Ireland at Windsor Park in front of 30,000 people. The game ended 7–3 to Scotland. He was one of the last players to be capped by the full national side while still an amateur.

Chalmers was a trained chartered accountant and continued in this profession after his playing retirement.

References

External links
Profile at StretfordEnd.co.uk
Profile at MUFCinfo.com

1907 births
Footballers from Glasgow
Scottish footballers
Scotland international footballers
Queen's Park F.C. players
Heart of Midlothian F.C. players
Manchester United F.C. players
Dunfermline Athletic F.C. players
Association football inside forwards
1989 deaths
English Football League players
Scottish Football League players
Scottish accountants
Scotland amateur international footballers
20th-century Scottish businesspeople